Sexo (stylized as Sexo!!) is the second album by the Brazilian rock band Ultraje a Rigor, released in 1987.

Track listing
"Eu Gosto de Mulher" ("I Like Women")
"Dênis, o quê você quer ser quando crescer?" ("Dênis, what do you want to be when you grow up?")
"Terceiro" ("Third")
"A Festa" ("The Party")
"Prisioneiro" ("Prisoner")
"Sexo!!" ("Sex!!")
"Pelado" ("Naked")
"Ponto de ônibus" ("Bus Stop")
"Maximillian Sheldon" 
"Will Robinson e seus Robots" ("Will Robinson and his Robots")

Personnel
Roger Rocha Moreira – lead vocals and guitar.
Carlo Bartolini (Carlinhos) – guitar
Sérgio Serra – guitar
Maurício Defendi – bass guitar
Leôspa – drums

Certifications

References

Ultraje a Rigor albums
1987 albums